At Echo Lake is the fifth studio album by the band Woods.  Pitchfork Media placed it at number 31 on its list "The Top 50 Albums of 2010."

Track listing

References

2010 albums
Woods (band) albums
Woodsist albums